John FitzGerald Park is a GAA stadium in Kilmallock, County Limerick, Ireland.  It is the home of Kilmallock GAA club and is one of the main grounds of Limerick GAA's Gaelic football and hurling teams.

References

Gaelic games grounds in the Republic of Ireland
Limerick GAA
Sports venues in County Limerick